Veigaia is a genus of mites in the family Veigaiidae.

Species
 Veigaia agilis (Berlese, 1916)
 Veigaia anmashanensis Tseng, 1994
 Veigaia ashizuriensis Ishikawa, 1978
 Veigaia belovae Davydova, 1979
 Veigaia benoiti Loots, 1980
 Veigaia bogdanovi Davydova, 1978
 Veigaia bregetovae Petrova & Makarova, 1989
 Veigaia capreolus (Berlese, 1905)
 Veigaia carpillaris Tseng, 1994
 Veigaia cerva (Kramer, 1876)
 Veigaia clavata Ma-Liming & Wang-Shenron, 1998
 Veigaia cuneata Ma, 1996
 Veigaia exigua (Berlese, 1916)
 Veigaia formosana Tseng, 1994
 Veigaia gentiles Womersley, 1956
 Veigaia hohuanshanensis Tseng, 1994
 Veigaia incisa Hurlbutt, 1984
 Veigaia inexpectata Kaluz, 1993
 Veigaia kawasawai Ishikawa, 1982
 Veigaia kochi (Trägårdh, 1901)
 Veigaia lauseggeri Schmolzer, 1992
 Veigaia letovae Davydova, 1979
 Veigaia limulus Tseng, 1994
 Veigaia mitis (Berlese, 1916)
 Veigaia nemorensis (C.L.Koch, 1836)
 Veigaia nodosoides Hurlbutt, 1984
 Veigaia paradoxa Willmann, 1951
 Veigaia philippiensis Hurlbutt, 1984
 Veigaia planicola (Berlese, 1892)
 Veigaia preendopodalia Hurlbutt, 1984
 Veigaia propinqua Willmann, 1936
 Veigaia pseudouncata Tseng, 1994
 Veigaia relicta Schmolzer, 1995
 Veigaia sinicus Ma & Piao, 1981
 Veigaia sylvatica Hurlbutt, 1984
 Veigaia tangwanghensis Ma & Yin, 1999
 Veigaia uncata Farrier, 1957
 Veigaia wyandottensis (Packard, 1888)

References

Mesostigmata